Marion Jones (born 1975) is a Belizean-American track and field athlete and basketball player.

Marion Jones may also refer to:

 Marion Jones Farquhar (1879–1965), née Jones, American tennis player
 Marion Jones (academic) (born 1944), New Zealand nursing academic
 Marion Patrick Jones (1934–2016), Trinidadian novelist